Jason Goes to Hell: The Final Friday is a 1993 American supernatural slasher film directed by Adam Marcus, written by Jay Huguely and Dean Lorey, and produced by Sean S. Cunningham. The ninth installment in the Friday the 13th franchise and a sequel to Friday the 13th Part VIII: Jason Takes Manhattan (1989), it stars John D. LeMay, Kari Keegan, Steven Williams, and Kane Hodder as Jason Voorhees; the latter reprising his role from the previous two films. It is the first film in the series to be distributed by New Line Cinema. Set after the events of Jason Takes Manhattan, the film follows Jason's spirit as it possesses various people to continue his killings after his death. To resurrect himself, Jason must find and possess a member of his bloodline, but he can also be permanently killed by one of his surviving relatives using a magical dagger.

The film was conceived by co-writer and director Marcus under Cunningham, producer and director of the first film. After the low box-office returns of Friday the 13th Part VIII: Jason Takes Manhattan, Paramount Pictures sold the character rights of Jason Voorhees to New Line. Jason Goes to Hell was theatrically released on August 13, 1993, and grossed $15.9 million at the box office on a budget of $3 million, becoming the second-worst performing film in the series, after Jason Takes Manhattan. The film was panned by critics and fans alike, criticizing its supernatural elements and elimination of Jason Voorhees as a physical character.

The next installment in the series, Jason X, was released in 2001, and a narrative sequel/crossover, Freddy vs. Jason, was released in 2003.

Plot
A few years after his supposed demise in  Manhattan, Jason Voorhees has been inexplicably resurrected and returns to Camp Crystal Lake, where he stalks a lone woman. The woman, who is an undercover FBI agent, lures Jason into an ambush, where armed FBI and SWAT agents shoot him and obliterate his body with an airstrike. Jason's remains are sent to a morgue, where his still-beating heart entices the coroner to eat it, allowing Jason's soul to possess him. Jason, in the coroner's body, escapes the morgue, killing another coroner and two FBI guards in the process.

At Crystal Lake, Jason finds three partying teenagers and kills them. When two police officers are called to investigate the murders, Jason kills one of them and possesses the other. Meanwhile, bounty hunter Creighton Duke discovers that only members of Jason's bloodline can permanently kill him, and he will return to his original, near-invincible state if he possesses a family member. The only living relatives of Jason are his half-sister Diana Kimble, her daughter Jessica, and Stephanie, the infant daughter of Jessica and Steven Freeman.

Jason heads to Diana's house and attempts to possess her, but Steven defends her. Diana is killed and Jason escapes. Steven is blamed for Diana's murder and arrested. In the jail, he meets Duke, who provides Steven with information about Jason and his relation to Jessica. Determined to get to Jessica before Jason does, Steven escapes from jail. Steven goes to the Voorhees house to find evidence to convince Jessica of her ties to Jason. Jessica's boyfriend, TV reporter Robert Campbell, enters the house and receives a phone call. Steven overhears the resulting conversation, which reveals that Campbell is attempting to "spice up" his show's ratings by emphasizing Jason's return from death, having stolen Diana's body from the morgue for this reason. Jason appears and grabs Campbell, and transfers his heart to him through their mouths. Now in Campbell's body, Jason leaves with Steven in pursuit and attempts to possess Jessica to be reborn, but Steven hits him and drags Jessica to his car. When he tries to explain the situation to Jessica, she doesn't believe him and leaves  the police station without him.

Jason arrives at the police station and kills all officers along his path to Jessica, whom he nearly possesses before Steven stops him again. In the resulting chaos, Duke escapes from his cell. Now believing Steven, Jessica accompanies him to the diner to retrieve Stephanie. When Jason arrives he is attacked by the shop's owners and a waitress, all of whom he kills. Jessica and Steven discover a note from Duke, telling them that he has Stephanie and demanding that Jessica meet him at the Voorhees house alone.

Jessica abandons Steven so she can meet Duke and is given a mystical dagger that she can use to kill Jason permanently. A police officer enters the diner, only for Jason to transfer his heart into him. Duke falls through the floor of the Voorhees house, just as Sheriff Landis and Officer Randy arrive to confront Jessica. Landis is accidentally killed with the dagger, which Jessica then drops. Jason, possessing Randy, attempts to be reborn through Stephanie, but Steven arrives and kills him with a machete. Jason's heart, which has grown into a demonic infant, crawls out of Randy's neck. Steven and Jessica pull Duke out of the basement as the creature discovers Diana's body and slithers into her, allowing Jason to be reborn and burst up through the floor in his original body, fully clothed and masked.

While Steven and Jessica attempt to retrieve the dagger, Duke distracts Jason and is killed. Jason turns his attention to Jessica before Steven tackles him through a window. The two battle outside while Jessica retrieves the dagger and stabs Jason in the chest. As the souls Jason accumulated are released, demonic hands burst out of the ground and pull Jason into Hell. Steven and Jessica then reconcile and walk off into the sunrise with their baby. Later, a dog unearths Jason's mask while digging in the dirt. Freddy Krueger's laugh is heard as his gloved hand bursts out of the dirt, pulling Jason's mask into Hell.

Cast

 Kane Hodder as Jason Voorhees / FBI Guard
 John D. LeMay as Steven Freeman
 Kari Keegan as Jessica Kimble
 Steven Williams as Creighton Duke
 Allison Smith as Vicki Sanders
 Erin Gray as Diana Kimble
 Steven Culp as Robert Campbell 
 Rusty Schwimmer as Joey B.
 Leslie Jordan as Shelby B. 
 Billy "Green" Bush as Sheriff Landis
 Andrew Bloch as Deputy Josh 
 Kipp Marcus as Randy Parker 
 Richard Gant as Phil the Coroner 
 Adam Cranner as Ward
 Julie Michaels as Elizabeth Marcus
 James Gleason  as Agent Abernathy 
 Dean Lorey as Eric Pope
 Adam Marcus as Officer Bish
 Mark Thompson as Officer Mark
 Brian Phelps as Officer Brian
 Blake Conway as Officer Andell
 Madelon Curtis as Officer Ryan
 Paul Devine as Paul
 Michelle Clunie as Deborah
 Michael B. Silver as Luke
 Kathryn Atwood as Alexis
 Jonathan Penner as David
 Brooke Scher as Stephanie Kimble

LeMay is one of only two actors from Friday the 13th: The Series to appear in the film franchise; the other is John Shepherd, who played Tommy Jarvis in Friday the 13th: A New Beginning.

Production

Development
Producer Sean S. Cunningham originally conceived an action-horror film in which Jason Voorhees would battle Freddy Krueger of the A Nightmare on Elm Street series. Paramount Pictures, who had released the previous eight Friday the 13th films, negotiated with New Line Cinema over the rights to the series, and ultimately granted New Line rights to the Jason Voorhees character, but retained control of the Friday the 13th title. New Line placed Cunningham's idea for a Freddy-versus-Jason film on hold, prompting him to generate a different script to precede that plot line. Cunningham's original idea would later manifest as Freddy vs. Jason in 2003. The studio courted John McTiernan and Tobe Hooper to helm the film. Adam Marcus, who served as an apprentice for editor Susan E. Cunningham during post production for Friday the 13th Part 2, was brought in by Cunningham to direct the film under the notion that he must remove Jason's hockey mask. Cunningham has denied ever telling Marcus to "find a way to get rid of that f**king mask", however, Marcus rebukes Cunningham's claim and insists that he did not have that level of creative control. Cunningham had also demanded that the events of Friday the 13th Part VIII: Jason Takes Manhattan be ignored. The filmmaker's initial pitch saw Elias Voorhees, Jason's brother, digging up his body at the beginning of the film, eating his heart, taking on his supernatural powers and embarking on a similar killing spree. Jay Huguely was hired to flesh out Marcus' ideas into a script. According to Marcus, he had originally written the character of Steven Freeman to be Tommy Jarvis from part 4-6, but New Line Cinema only owned the rights to Jason and not Tommy and so could not legally use that character at the time. Marcus also explains that New Line Cinema did not own the Friday the 13th title, explaining why the film titles after Jason Takes Manhattan did not include the franchise name up until the 2009 remake.

Huguely's draft was reportedly "[...] a hodgepodge of a script" and "unintelligible". Cunningham hired Dean Lorey to scrap Huguely’s work and write a completely new script within four days, removing Elias Voorhees from the story as Lorey felt that Jason must be the central character. Lorey's initial idea for the film saw Jason caught in between a gang war in Los Angeles, but an impending production start immediately shot down the writer's pitch. Michael DeLuca of New Line disliked Lorey's rewrite but greenlit the film regardless. Lorey moved onto another project, prompting the studio to turn to Leslie Bohem, who provided a polish to the script over a weekend. Lewis Abernathy of House IV: The Repossession was enlisted for further rewrites for the opening sequence.

The film marked Adam Marcus' debut feature; having just graduated from film school, Marcus was originally attached to direct My Boyfriend's Back for Touchstone Pictures, but the studio's parent company, Walt Disney Studios, did not want to hire a first-time director, and Marcus was dropped from the project. Marcus, who was a lifelong fan of the Friday the 13th series, developed a story in which Voorhees is destroyed at the beginning of the narrative, only to manifest in the bodies of other people and continue his rampage. Marcus would later acknowledge the concept's similarity to that of The Hidden, though he stated he had not seen the film at that time, and that the similarity was coincidental. Marcus decided that he wanted to create the most deliberately stereotypical and cliché-ridden opening of the film as possible to toy with the audience's expectations, only for the story to take an unprecedented turn with Jason's unexpected "death" by the hands of the SWAT team. 
The special effects were provided by Al Magliochetti and effects studio KNB, the former having signed on to the film after friends of his from KNB notified him of its development. The colors of the visual effects were chosen by Marcus.

Casting
Tony Todd auditioned for the role of Creighton Duke, which went to Steven Williams. Laurie Holden was Adam Marcus' and Dean Lorey's choice for the role of Jessica Kimble, but Sean Cunningham overruled them and pushed for Kari Keegan instead.

Filming
Production began on July 20, 1992 in Los Angeles, California. Cunningham had asked for the film to be shot at twenty two frames per second as opposed to twenty four. Marcus claims he clashed with Cunningham following a dispute over creative decision near the end of filming. A shower scene involving actress Kari Keegan resulted in Marcus being removed from set due to a dispute between the two, as the actress protested from doing nudity for the film. Cunningham would step in as director in place of Marcus for the film few days of the film. Approximately half of the film was reshot as Cunningham was unsatisfied with the initial cut of the film. Filming concluded on September 4, 1992.

Retrospective insight
In November 2017, Adam Marcus revealed that an overlooked plot-point of the movie is that Jason Voorhees is actually connected to the Evil Dead franchise. The filmmaker stated, “Pamela Voorhees makes a deal with the devil by reading from the Necronomicon to bring back her son. This is why Jason isn’t Jason. He’s Jason plus The Evil Dead, and now I can believe that he can go from a little boy that lives in a lake, to a full grown man in a couple of months, to Zombie Jason, to never being able to kill this guy. That, to me, is way more interesting as a mashup, and [Evil Dead creator Sam] Raimi loved it! It’s not like I could tell New Line my plan to include The Evil Dead, because they don’t own The Evil Dead. So it had to be an Easter egg, and I did focus on it…there’s a whole scene that includes the book, and I hoped people would get it and could figure out that’s what I’m up to. So yes, in my opinion, Jason Voorhees is a Deadite. He’s one of The Evil Dead.”

In December 2017 on the podcast Cinema Toast Crunchcast, Marcus revealed Creighton Duke's intended backstory, "A teenage Creighton was out on Crystal Lake with his girlfriend. Jason capsized their small boat and pulled the girl down into the lake. Creighton tried to save her but could not. She was never seen again. Creighton vowed revenge and from that moment on he spent his life in the study and pursuit of Jason. He became a bounty hunter just to fund his work in taking down his nemesis."

Music

The film's musical score was composed by Harry Manfredini, who had previously composed music for the first seven films in the series. A soundtrack album was released by Edel Screen as a CD in the United States in 2005.

Home media
The film was released on DVD in North America by New Line Home Video in 2002, and includes two cuts: the theatrical cut, created to receive an R rating from the MPAA, and the unrated (or director's) cut, which runs three minutes longer than the theatrical version and contains material beyond what is allowed under the R rating. In certain regions of the world, including Australia, the DVD was only released with the R-rated version of the film available to view.

On September 13, 2013, Paramount and Warner Bros. co-released Friday the 13th: The Complete Collection in a Blu-ray box set, featuring each of the twelve films in the franchise; this marked the first Blu-ray release of Jason Goes to Hell. This collection is currently out of print, but the film has been released separately in the higher definition format with its successor, Jason X.

Both the theatrical and unrated versions of the film were added to the Friday the 13th: The Ultimate Collection Blu-ray set that Scream Factory released in October 2020.

The movie was also released on VHS.

Reception

Box office
Jason Goes to Hell: The Final Friday debuted in U.S. theaters on Friday, August 13, 1993, to a weekend box office total of $7.6 million across 1,355 screens. The film would go on to gross a final domestic total of $15.9 million, making it the second-worst performing film in the franchise, after Jason Takes Manhattan which made $14.3 million. It placed at number 86 on the list of the year's Top 100 earners.

Critical response
On the Review aggregator website Rotten Tomatoes, Jason Goes to Hell: The Final Friday holds a 20% approval rating, based on 20 reviews. 
On Metacritic, it has a weighted average score of 17 out of 100, based on 11 critics, indicating "overwhelming dislike".

The Los Angeles Timess Michael Wilmington praised the performance of Gant as well as Harry Manfredini's score, but noted "ludicrous characters", "garbled nonstop gore", and poor lighting as notable faults. Richard Harrington of The Washington Post wrote of the film: "The scriptwriters try to conjure some history/mythology to validate the plot's twists and turns, but the whole thing ends up more confusing than Days of Our Lives on fast-forward." Terry Kelleher of Newsday similarly criticized the plot, referring to it as a "confusing mess," though he conceded the film "offers a little humor."

Stephen Holden of The New York Times noted: "The ninth episode in the phenomenally successful series, which began in 1980, The Final Friday is a largely incoherent movie that generates little suspense and relies for the majority of its thrills on close-up gore...Such gratuitous sadism gives The Final Friday an edge of sourness that is unusual for a horror movie. It doesn't help that Jason's intended victims (and the actors who play them) are pallid sitting ducks." The Boston Globes Betsy Sherman wrote: "First time director Adam Marcus plays around nicely with the F13 cliches, but doesn't have much original to add. The movie has a crowdpleasing final shot that suggests that the real joy ride to hell will be next time around. Maybe."

Writing for Variety, Greg Evans criticized the screenplay as well as Marcus's direction: "With one or two exceptions, freshman director Adam Marcus forgoes the camp humor and inside jokes that marked the tail end of the slasher craze, opting instead for a straightforward Saturday night drive-in approach...Blame Marcus for the film’s complete lack of tension and style, but also point a machete or two at a bland, occasionally inept cast and scripters unable to contribute a single innovation to the genre."

Robert Cauthorn of the Arizona Daily Star wrote: "Yeah, there's a lot of shower taking and slaughter here. And a plot about evil bloodlines, tabloid TV, soul shifting, and God knows what else. It doesn't make a lick of sense, but it's a definite improvement over the other non-movies in the series." The Statesman Journals Ron Cowan wrote: "The ninth version of this fitful series is easily the clumsiest, worst acted, most gory and worst written of the bunch, as ready to indulge in sexual titillation as sadism and oozing bodies." Kory Wilcoxson of The Courier-Journal also criticized the film's gratuitous violence, adding that "the plot is ridiculous, the dialogue wooden and the acting a laugh. But you know that going in. The question is: Is it scary? Not really. It's more disgusting than frightening."

Other media

Comic books

A three-issue comic adaptation of Jason Goes to Hell: The Final Friday written by Andy Mangels was published by Topps Comics. As the comics are based upon the original shooting script of the film, elements that were left out of the film are used in them.

Trading card
Topps also released a series of trading cards for the film.

Novelization
The FBI sting that occurs at the beginning of the film is foreshadowed in the novel Friday the 13th: Hate-Kill-Repeat, which takes place between the events of the seventh and eighth films. The epilogue of the book states that the FBI, upon discovering Jason Voorhees actually exists, have begun making plans to trap him and "send him straight to Hell."

Other references
 Freddy Krueger's clawed hand coming out of the ground and taking Jason's mask was a reference to the future crossover Freddy vs. Jason between the two, which had been in development hell since 1987. It was finally finished in 2003, a year after this film's sequel.
 The film features the appearances of the Kandarian dagger and Necronomicon Ex Mortis from Evil Dead II. Jason, Freddy, and Ash Williams would later meet in the comic book series Freddy vs. Jason vs. Ash (a story adapted by writer Jeff Katz from a Freddy vs. Jason 2 screenplay treatment he had written in 2004) and again in Freddy vs. Jason vs. Ash: The Nightmare Warriors.

Video games
The Jason Goes to Hell depiction of Jason Voorhees is featured in 2017's Friday the 13th: The Game. Because of a continuity error in the film regarding Jason's damaged eye, his in-game character model is mirrored from his movie counterpart. As the Gun Media developers explained, "In [Jason Goes to Hell], everyone kind of knows there was a mistake made with Jason's undermask. It's Jason's left eye that’s supposed to be damaged, 'cause in Part 4 he takes the machete to the head. But in [Jason Goes to Hell], it was reversed on accident. So we decided to fix it." The game officially reveals Jason's facial appearance from underneath the mask, which was not seen in the film.

References

External links
 
 
 
 
 Film page at the Camp Crystal Lake web site
 Film page at Fridaythe13thfilms.com

1990s slasher films
1990s supernatural films
1993 directorial debut films
1993 films
1993 horror films
American sequel films
American slasher films
American supernatural horror films
1990s English-language films
Films about cannibalism
Films about summer camps
Films directed by Adam Marcus
Films scored by Harry Manfredini
Films set in 2003
Films set in New Jersey
Films set in Ohio
Films set in the future
9
Body swapping in films
Hell in popular culture
New Line Cinema films
Sororicide in fiction
Supernatural slasher films
Films set in hell
1990s American films